Chiantla Municipal Palace or Palacio municipal is a palace and government building in Chiantla, Guatemala.

Palaces in Guatemala
Chiantla